Eric Pfeiffer Newman (May 25, 1911 – November 15, 2017) was an American numismatist. He wrote several "works about early American coins and paper money considered the standards on their subjects", as well as hundreds of articles. Newman sold his coins over auctions in 2013–2014 for over $70 million and used most of that money to fund the Newman Numismatic Education Society and its Newman Numismatic Portal to "make the literature and images of numismatics, particularly American numismatics, available to everyone on a free and forever basis."

Early life
Newman was born to Samuel Elijah and Rose (Pfeiffer) Newman in St. Louis, Missouri. His interest in coins began at the age of seven when his grandfather gave him an 1859 Indian Head cent. When he was ten years old, he would visit Burdette G. Johnson's coin store in downtown St. Louis every couple of weeks; Johnson became his friend and mentor.

Education and career
Newman earned a Bachelor of Science degree from the Massachusetts Institute of Technology (MIT) in 1932 and a Juris Doctor from Washington University in St. Louis in 1935. Three years later, Newman became vice president of the Missouri Numismatic Society. In 1939, Newman was appointed Secretary-Treasurer of the Central States Numismatics Society. He then practiced law until 1943. The following year, he was hired by Edison Brothers Stores, rising to executive vice president in 1968, before retiring in 1987.

While attending MIT, Newman became slightly acquainted with E. H. R. Green, himself a coin collector. Newman and other students were given the use of Green's private radio station at Round Hill, Massachusetts, to follow Rear Admiral Richard E. Byrd's first Antarctic expedition (1928–1930). After Green died in 1936, Newman raised $600 from his family and purchased some currency notes from the estate. After he told Burdette Johnson about it, Johnson put up the money to buy most of Green's collection, including the only five known 1913 Liberty Head nickels. Newman's favorite coin, however, was a unique 1792 pattern in gold that he believed was owned by George Washington.

Newman wrote over 13 numismatic books. He is known for his pioneering study The Early Paper Money of America (1967), which remains the standard work on the subject and has entered its fifth edition. Other written works include The 1776 Continental Currency Coinage: Varieties of the Fugio Cent (1952), The Fantastic 1804 Dollar (1962) and U.S. Coin Scales and Counterfeit Coin Detectors (2000).

Personal life and legacy
Newman married Evelyn Edison on November 29, 1939. They had two children. 

The Newmans supported a variety of philanthropic efforts including medical research, academia, and St. Louis cultural affairs. In 2003, the Newmans donated two million dollars to Washington University in St. Louis to establish the Newman Money Museum, housed in the Mildred Lane Kemper Art Museum. It opened in 2006 and displayed part of Newman's collection on a rotating basis. They also established the Eric P. Newman Education Center at the Washington University School of Medicine and established numerous professorships and scholarships. 

Evelyn Newman died on September 1, 2015, at the age of 95. Eric Newman died on November 15, 2017, at the age of 106.

Awards and honors
Among his many honors are the Archer M. Huntington Medal (the highest award of the American Numismatic Society) in 1978 and the Medal of the Royal Numismatic Society in 1991. The American Numismatic Association inducted him into its Hall of Fame in 1986 and named him Numismatist of the Year in 1996. The American Numismatic Society commissioned a bas-relief portrait that was presented to him at his 100th birthday celebration.

External links
Eric P. Newman Coin Collection Gallery
Newman Numismatic Portal
Truth Seeker: The Life of Eric P. Newman, Researched & Written by Leonard Augsburger, Roger W. Burdette & Joel Orosz. Edited by James Halperin

References

1911 births
2017 deaths
American centenarians
American numismatists
Massachusetts Institute of Technology alumni
Men centenarians
Washington University School of Law alumni
Writers from St. Louis